Piz Albana (3,100 m) is a mountain of the Albula Alps, overlooking Champfèr in the canton of Graubünden. It lies east of Piz Julier, on the range north of the Julier Pass.

References

External links
 Piz Albana on Hikr

Mountains of the Alps
Mountains of Graubünden
Mountains of Switzerland